Uloborus campestratus is a species of cribellate orb weaver in the spider family Uloboridae. It is found in a range from the United States to Venezuela.

References

Uloboridae
Articles created by Qbugbot
Spiders described in 1893